Jeremy Lonnie Beasley (born November 20, 1995) is an American professional baseball pitcher for the Hanshin Tigers of Nippon Professional Baseball (NPB). He has previously played in MLB for the Arizona Diamondbacks and Toronto Blue Jays.

Career

Los Angeles Angels
Beasley was drafted in the 30th round of the 2017 Major League Baseball Draft, 895th overall by the Los Angeles Angels from Clemson University. He signed with the team on June 23 and was assigned to the rookie-level AZL Angels, and also played for the rookie-level Orem Owlz, posting a cumulative 3.13 ERA in 17 games. In 2018, Beasley split the year between the Double-A Mobile BayBears, the High-A Inland Empire 66ers, and the Single-A Burlington Bees, pitching to a 6–7 record and 2.66 ERA in 25 appearances between the three teams. For the 2019 season, Beasley was assigned to Mobile to begin the year, and received a late season promotion to the Triple-A Salt Lake Bees. On the season, Beasley posted a 7–7 record and 4.49 ERA with 115 strikeouts in 122.1 innings of work between the two levels.

Arizona Diamondbacks
On January 14, 2020, Beasley was traded to the Arizona Diamondbacks in exchange for Matt Andriese. Beasley was called up to the majors for the first time on August 10, 2020. He made his major league debut on August 11 against the Colorado Rockies, pitching a third of an inning and allowing two hits while notching his first career strikeout against Trevor Story. His debut proved to be his only appearance in 2020 as he was placed on the injured list on August 16 with a right shoulder strain and missed the remainder of the season.

On April 17, 2021, Beasley was designated for assignment by the Diamondbacks following the acquisition of Nick Heath.

Toronto Blue Jays
On April 22, 2021, Beasley was traded to the Toronto Blue Jays for cash considerations. He was assigned to the Triple-A Buffalo Bisons and was later recalled to Toronto's active roster. After struggling to a 7.71 ERA in 8 appearances with Toronto, Beasley was designated for assignment on June 30. He was outrighted to Buffalo on July 4. Beasley had his contract selected from the minors on June 2, 2022.

Pittsburgh Pirates
On August 2, 2022, Beasley was traded to the Pittsburgh Pirates in exchange for cash considerations. He was designated for assignment on November 15 and released the next day.

Hanshin Tigers
On December 13, 2022, Beasley signed with the Hanshin Tigers of Nippon Professional Baseball.

References

External links

1995 births
Living people
Arizona Diamondbacks players
Arizona League Angels players
Baseball players from Georgia (U.S. state)
Buffalo Bisons (minor league) players
Burlington Bees players
Clemson Tigers baseball players
Inland Empire 66ers of San Bernardino players
Major League Baseball pitchers
Mobile BayBears players
Orem Owlz players
People from Lyons, Georgia
Salt Lake Bees players
Toronto Blue Jays players